John Harvey Astell  (20 March 1806 – 17 January 1887) was a British Conservative politician.

Astell was first elected as a Conservative MP for Cambridge in 1852, but his term was short-lived after, upon petition, he was unseated in March 1853, when the writ for the seat was also suspended. He later became MP for Ashburton in 1859 and held the seat until 1865 when he did not seek re-election.

References

External links
 

1806 births
1887 deaths
UK MPs 1852–1857
UK MPs 1859–1865
Conservative Party (UK) MPs for English constituencies
Deputy Lieutenants of Bedfordshire
Members of the Parliament of the United Kingdom for Ashburton